USS Wildcat was a two masted schooner of 48 tons  and was part of a U.S. naval fleet, and part of the West Indies Squadron, that sailed to the Caribbean to subdue the occurrence of pirate raids on merchant ships that had increased to almost 3,000 by the early 1820s. She was armed with three guns and had a crew of 31. Wildcat was commanded by Lieutenant Legare' who sailed her to Washington with a dispatch regarding the disposition of the squadron and other matters concerning the war against piracy in the Caribbean. On 28 October 1824 Wildcat was lost in a gale with all hands while sailing between Cuba and Thompson's Island, West Indies. Approximately 31 drowned.

See also
USS Ferret (1822) Ship that was also part of the same fleet as Wildcat
List of historical schooners
Piracy in the Caribbean
West Indies Anti-Piracy Operations of the United States
Alternative map of early 1800s West Indies</center>
Bibliography of early American naval history

References

Bibliography

 , Book

 , Url

 Url

 E'Book

 E'Book (Primary source)

Further reading
 Carey, Thomas (1834). The History of the PiratesHenry Benton, Hartford, Conn. p. 283, E'Book

 Wombwell, James A. (2010) The Long War Against Piracy: Historical TrendsCombat Studies Institute, p. 204, Book

1822 ships
Ships involved in anti-piracy efforts
Wild Cat